The following is a list of notable events that are related to Philippine music in 2020.

Debuts and Disbanding in 2020

Debuting groups
1st.One
Baby Blue
Bandang Lapis
Clover
The Knobs
Wonder Hiraya

Solo debut
Aldrich Ang
Alexa Ilacad
Charles Dela Cruz
Emman
Gabba
Ivana Alawi
J-Nine
Kemrie
King Promdi
Maine Mendoza
Mikee Sibayan
Mimiyuuuh
Minzy
SAB
Tanikala Morobeats
Zild

Reunion/Comebacks
BBS (Big Band Syndicate)
Eevee
Us-2 Evil-0

Disbandments
CLOVER
Music Hero
Slapshock

On hiatus
IV of Spades
Munimuni

Releases in 2020
The following albums are to be released in 2020 locally. Note: All soundtracks are not included in this list.

First Quarter

January

February

March

Second Quarter

April

May

June

Third Quarter

July

August

September

Fourth Quarter

October

November

December

Concerts and music festivals
NOTE: Because of the coronavirus pandemic's start of local transmission in March 2020, all shows from March 2020 onwards were postponed or cancelled.

Local artists

International artists

Notes

Music festivals

Notes

Virtual concerts

Canceled/postponed dates

Notes

References

Philippines
Music
Philippine music industry